Giovanni Battista Ciolina (15 May 1870 – 29 May 1955) was an Italian neo-impressionist and divisionist painter.

Biography 
Born into a family of Valle Vigezzo farmers in 1870, he attended the Rossetti Valentini Art School in Santa Maria Maggiore - where he became close friends with other future painters such as Carlo Fornara, Gian Maria Rastellini and Lorenzo Peretti Junior - for five years, beginning in 1882, absorbing the teachings of Enrico Cavalli, a great connoisseur of the French art of the era and the historic innovator of painting in Valle Vigezzo.

In the late 1880s, he received a two-year scholarship to attend the Scuola libera del nudo at the Accademia di Belle Arti in Venice. A talented and precocious artist, he demonstrated the level of excellence he had achieved with the works Ritratto della madre (Portrait of the Artist’s Mother) (1890) and L'ombrellino rosso (The Little Red Umbrella) (1892). In the company of his friend and fellow painter Carlo Fornara, he spent a long period in Lyon between 1895 and 1896 studying the great masters and learning about the new painting on the other side of the Alps. On his return to Italy he turned to Divisionism, applying the new technique according to the example of Giovanni Segantini. After his first showing, at the Third Triennale of Brera in 1897 with the painting Il filo spezzato (The Broken Thread), he opened a studio in Milan, where he produced numerous paintings in the divisionist style, including La lavandaia (The Washerwoman), Fanciulla che guarda dalla finestra (Girl looking out the window) and Mestizia crepuscolare (Twilight Sorrow). He took part in numerous exhibitions in Italy and abroad, and, after gradually abandoning Divisionism, arrived at the Venice  of 1907 with the painting Preludio di primavera (Prelude to Spring), making extensive use of impasto and retaining the luminosity of his earliest works, but with the addition of a melancholy lyricism typical of Neo-impressionism, often entrusted to compositions of broad and powerful scope as in paintings Ritorno all’alpe (Return to the mountain pasture) and Toceno al tramonto (Toceno at sunset).

At the outbreak of the Great War, Ciolina left Milan and retired to Valle Vigezzo, where he continued to paint landscapes, still lifes and religious frescoes until his death.

Exhibitions 
 "Giovanni Battista Ciolina – Umanità e paesaggi della Val Vigezzo": , Pallanza, 1986
 "Una scuola di pittura in Val Vigezzo: 1881-1919": Turin/Novara, 1990
 "Carlo Fornara. Un maestro del divisionismo": Trento, 1998
 "Carlo Fornara. Il colore della valle": Acqui Terme, 2007
 "Paesaggi dell'Ottocento. Verso la luce": Riva del Garda, 2010
 "Le soglie della natura": Arco di Trento, 2010
 "Alessandro Poscio, collezionista appassionato": Domodossola, 2014
 "Carlo Fornara e il ritratto vigezzino": Domodossola, 2015

Literature 
 Thieme-Becker: "Allgemeines Lexikon der Bildenden Künstler von der Antike bis zur Gegenwart", Seemann, Leipzig, 1907-1950
 Guido Cesura: "Enrico Cavalli e la pittura vigezzina", Colombi, Milan, 1974
 Davide Ramoni: "Scuola di belle arti Rossetti Valentini in Santa Maria Maggiore. Vicende e contributi alla pittura vigezzina nel centenario della fondazione", tip. S. Gaudenzio, Novara, 1978
 Aurora Scotti: "Giovanni Battista Ciolina, umanità e paesaggi della valle Vigezzo", Vangelista, Verbania, 1986
 Dario Gnemmi: "Una scuola di pittura in Val Vigezzo: 1881-1919. Carlo Giuseppe ed Enrico Cavalli, Giovanni Battista Ciolina, Carlo Fornara", Il Quadrante, Turin, 1990
 Guido Cesura: "Enrico Cavalli pittore", Grossi, Domodossola, 1993
 Dario Gnemmi: "Retour à la ferme", Biglia Club, Domodossola, 1993
 Annie-Paule Quinsac: "Carlo Fornara. Un maestro del Divisionismo", Skira, Milan, 1998
 Francesco Ferrari: "La scuola di belle arti Rossetti Valentini in Santa Maria Maggiore", Grossi, Domodossola, 1999
 Dario Gnemmi: "Monticelli e la scuola di Enrico Cavalli", Madame Webb, Domodossola, 2006
 Dario Gnemmi: "Vigezzini di Francia. Pittura d'alpe e d'Oltralpe tra Otto e Novecento in Valle Vigezzo", Skira, Milan, 2007
 Giovanna Nicoletti: "Paesaggi dell'Ottocento. Verso la luce", Temi, Trento, 2009
 Giovanna Nicoletti/Dario Gnemmi: "Le soglie della natura", Grafica 5, Arco di Trento, 2010
 Davide Brullo: "Appassionata incompetenza. I primi cinquant'anni della collezione Poscio", Madame Webb, Domodossola, 2011

References

External links
 A gallery of Ciolina's paintings in Collezione Poscio, Domodossola
 Archives of  exhibitions
 Archives of exhibitions at Collezione Poscio 

Landscape painters
Portrait painters
1870 births
1953 deaths
19th-century Italian painters
20th-century Italian painters
20th-century Italian male artists
Accademia di Belle Arti di Venezia alumni
19th-century Italian male artists